Taivale "Junior" Tautalatasi Jr. (born March 24, 1962) is a former American football running back. He played college football at Washington State and in the National Football League (NFL) for the Philadelphia Eagles and Dallas Cowboys.

Early years
Born in Oakland, California to a Samoan American family, Tautalatasi graduated from Encinal High School in nearby Alameda in 1981. After high school, he began his college football career at Chabot College, a junior college in Hayward where he would play in the 1981 and 1982 seasons.

He then transferred to Washington State University. After redshirting the 1983 season, he played in 1984 and 1985 with the Washington State Cougars, while playing behind Rueben Mayes (conference rushing leader) and Kerry Porter. With Washington State, Tautalatasi rushed for 402 yards and four touchdowns, averaging 6.3 yards per carry.

Professional career

Philadelphia Eagles
Tautalatasi was selected by the Philadelphia Eagles in the tenth round (261st overall) of the 1986 NFL Draft. He made the team after showing big play potential in the preseason. He appeared in all 16 games as the team's third down back and started 2 games, including the season opener, while Keith Byars was recovering from a foot injury. Although he was slowed down by a right knee injury, he finished with 41 receptions (second on the team) for 325 receiving yards (fourth on the team) and 51 carries for 163 rushing yards. He had 11 receptions in the tenth game against the New York Giants. He recorded a 50-yard run in the seventh game against the Dallas Cowboys. He made a 56-yard reception in the fifth game against the Atlanta Falcons.

Buddy Ryan, Tautalatasi's head coach with the Eagles, was unable to pronounce his last name and referred to him most often as "Junior Smith". In 1987, he posted 25 receptions for 176 yards and 26 carries for 69 yards. On November 9, 1988, he was waived to make room for running back Walter Abercrombie. Tautalatasi concluded the 1988 season with 48 receiving and 28 rushing yards.

Dallas Cowboys
On September 26, 1989, he was signed by the Dallas Cowboys as a free agent. A backup running back, Tautalatasi had 157 receiving yards and 15 rushing yards in six games. He was released on August 26, 1990.

References

1962 births
Living people
Sportspeople from Alameda, California
Players of American football from Oakland, California
American football running backs
Chabot Gladiators football players
Washington State Cougars football players
Philadelphia Eagles players
Dallas Cowboys players
American sportspeople of Samoan descent